Bromley North railway station is in the London Borough of Bromley in south-east London, in Travelcard Zone 4. The station and all trains serving it are operated by Southeastern. It is the terminus of the short Bromley North Branch Line from Grove Park.

History
The station was opened in 1878. It was extensively rebuilt by the Southern Railway in 1925-1926 by the Chief Architect to the Southern Railway, James Robb Scott.

The building has been Grade II listed since 31 August 1990.

Services

Historical services
After opening the station trains had direct services to Holborn Viaduct, Victoria, London Bridge, London Cannon Street and London Charing Cross.  From April 1976 this was cut back to a peak hour service before being withdrawn completely in 1990. In order to get from Bromley North to Central London passengers have to change at Grove Park.

Current services
All services at Bromley North are operated by Southeastern using  EMUs.

No services call at the station on Sundays or on Bank Holidays.

Connections with trains to London Charing Cross, London Cannon Street,  and  can be made by changing at Grove Park.

Connections
Bromley North is a hub terminus for buses in outer southeast London, with 13 day routes, one 24-hour route and one night-operating route serving the station, of which 10 of the day routes terminate/commence at Bromley North.

London Buses routes 61, 119, 126, 138, 146, 227, 246, 261, 269, 314, 336, 352, 354, 367 and night route N3 serve the station.

Future proposals
These schemes have not been taken beyond the proposal stage and recommendations are expected to be published around 2018.

See also 
Bromley South railway station, the main station in Bromley.

References

External links 

Railway stations in the London Borough of Bromley
Former South Eastern Railway (UK) stations
Railway stations in Great Britain opened in 1878
Railway stations served by Southeastern
James Robb Scott buildings
Grade II listed buildings in the London Borough of Bromley
Grade II listed railway stations